The Lorraine 12H Pétrel was a French V-12 supercharged, geared piston aeroengine initially rated at 370 kW (500 hp), but later developed to give 640 kW (860 hp).  It powered a variety of mostly French aircraft in the mid-1930s, several on an experimental basis.

Design and development
During the 1930s Société Lorraine, which in 1937 was nationalised into the Société Nationale de Construction de Moteurs (SNCM), continued its tradition of building large water-cooled aeroengines.  These later engines were named after birds: Eider, Courlis (en:curlew), Pétrel and Sterna. The last two remained in production in 1938.

The Pétrel was an upright V-12 engine with two banks of six cylinders, arranged at 60° to each other, driving a common crankshaft.  The cylinder blocks were bolted onto the crankcase, all light alloy parts.  The crankcase came in two pieces, with seven crankshaft bearings in the upper section. Roller bearings were used at the crankshaft ends; the remaining five were plain.  The upper crankcase section also had integrally cast water channels as part of the cooling system.

Steel cylinder liners were screwed into the heads, with their lower parts projecting into the crankcase.  Steel seats for valves and sparking plugs were shrunk into the heads.  The pistons were forged from alugir, with three compression and one scraper ring and floating bronze bushes for the gudgeon pins.  The twelve pistons were connected to the six crankpins in pairs, each with a master and an auxiliary connecting rod. The master rods had forked big ends with white metal bearings; the auxiliary rod ends ran between the forks on bronze bushes.

The Pétrel had four overhead valves per cylinder, two exhaust and two inlet, in bronze valve guides.  Each bank had its own overhead camshaft and each cam operated a pair of valves through T-shaped tappets, the stem of the T moving in a guide to avoid sideways force on the valve stems.  There were two sparking plugs per cylinder and twin magnetos. A carburettor fed the mixture into the intake of the supercharger, at the rear of the engine.  The Pétrel's output could be left or right handed; a Lorraine patent planet gearset, with six satellite gears, provided an 11:17 reduction of propeller shaft speed.

Engine lubrication was by forcing pressurized oil through the crankshaft, with sump scavenging.  The supercharger had its own lubrication system.

First run in 1932, the early Pétrels produced only 370 kW (500 hp) but by 1938 the engine had been developed into the 12Hars model which gave 640 kW (860 hp).  This variant was used by the Koolhoven F.K.55 fighter, where it drove a pair of counter-rotating, twin-bladed propellers.

Operational history
Like the Koolhoven F.K.55, many of the aircraft types to use the Pétrel were one-offs, testing the Lorraine against better known engines from Hispano-Suiza and Rolls-Royce but the Potez 542 version of the Potez 540 family were built in numbers, with 74 of these twin-engined, multi-role (bomber, reconnaissance and transport) aircraft supplied to the French and Spanish air forces.

Variants
12H Pétrel
Initial power .
12Ha

12Hars
.
12Hdr
 at 2300 rpm
12Hdrs
 at 2300 rpm
12Hfrs Normale
. 
12Hfrs Chasse
12Hgrs at 2800 rpm

Applications
Breguet Br.19.10
Fokker D.XVII
Hawker Fury
Hawker Hart
Koolhoven F.K.55
Nieuport-Delage NiD 82
Potez 39
Potez 542
P.Z.L. P.8/II
Renard R-31
Société Aérienne Bordelaise AB-21
French Motor Torpedo Boat Prototype 40K

Engines on display
 A Pétrel is on display in the aircraft section of the Musée Royal de l'Armée, Brussels.

Specifications (12Hfrs, Normale)

References

1930s aircraft piston engines
Petrel